Bohutín is a municipality and village in Příbram District in the Central Bohemian Region of the Czech Republic. It has about 1,800 inhabitants.

Administrative parts
Villages of Havírna, Tisová and Vysoká Pec are administrative parts of Bohutín.

Geography
It lies in the Brdy Highlands. The Litavka River flows through the municipality. There are two notable ponds, Vysokopecký and Vokačovský.

History
The first written mention of Bohutín is from 1379. Historically, it is a mining settlement associated with the mining of lead and silver ore.

Sights
The landmark of the Bohutín is the Church of the Saint Mary Magdalene. The original church from 1887 was destroyed by a fire in 1950, then it was again built in the pseudo-Gothic style.

In Vysoká Pec is a museum dedicated to Bohutín and its surroundings. Next to the museum is Řimbaba, a former mining tower converted into a lookout tower.

References

External links

Villages in Příbram District